Current reality tree refers to the repair activity for ships.  An initial inquiry checks for availability of dock space, repairs berth, vessel draft restriction and repairs scope compared with yard workload.

Water transport